Manostachya is a genus of flowering plants belonging to the family Rubiaceae.

Its native range is Tanzania to Eastern Tropical Africa.

Species
Species:

Manostachya juncoides 
Manostachya staelioides 
Manostachya ternifolia

References

Rubiaceae
Rubiaceae genera